Pidgeon is a surname from an archaic spelling of pigeon.

People
Notable persons with the surname include:

 Caroline Pidgeon, Liberal Democrat politician in the United Kingdom 
 Emily Pidgeon (born 1989), English athlete
 Frank Pidgeon (1825-1884), American baseball player
 George C. Pidgeon (1872–1971), Canadian religious minister
 Harry Pidgeon (1869–1954), American sailor, circumnavigator
 Jeff Pidgeon, American writer and actor
 John Pidgeon, Australian contractor and property developer
 Lloyd Montgomery Pidgeon (1903–1999), Canadian chemist and metallurgist
 Monica Pidgeon (1913–2009), British interior designer and architectural writer 
 Rebecca Pidgeon (born 1965), American actor and songwriter
 Valmai Pidgeon, Australian philanthropist and construction contractor
 W. R. Pidgeon, English inventor of an electrostatic machine
 Walter Pidgeon (1897–1984), Canadian actor
 William Pidgeon (1909-1981), Australian painter
 William Pidgeon (archaeologist) (c. 1800 – c. 1880), American antiquarian and archaeologist

See also 

 Pidgin (disambiguation)
 Pigeon (disambiguation)

English-language surnames